Lou DiMaggio is an American actor, writer, and former stand-up comedian. Beginning his career as a performer at Catch a Rising Star in New York City, he later relocated to Los Angeles, where he has worked as a writer. He is the father of actor Daniel DiMaggio.

Filmography

Acting

Film

Television

Writing

References 

Living people
American stand-up comedians
Year of birth missing (living people)